Samadhi is an Indian religious term, commonly translated as meditation or contemplation.

Samadhi may also refer to:

 Samadhi (shrine), a Hindi term for a mausoleum, tomb, or monument for a deceased saint or guru
 Mahasamādhi, act of leaving the body in the state of Samādhi
 Bhava samadhi
 Savikalpa samādhi
 Sānanda samādhi
 Samadhi Statue, Anuradhapura
 12472 Samadhi, an asteroid discovered in 1997

Names
 Samadi (surname)

Film, books and music
 Samadhi (actress) (born 1994), Mexican actress and performer
 Samadhi (1950 film), 1950 Bollywood film
 Samadhi (1972 film), 1972 Bollywood film
 samādhi Sheol, a character in the books The Chronicles of Thomas Covenant
 Secret Samadhi, a 1997 album by Live
 Samadhi Sound, an independent record label of David Sylvian